Japan–Nepal relations are foreign relations between Japan and Nepal. Diplomatic relations between the two countries were established on 28 September 1956. Japan has an embassy in Kathmandu. Nepal has an embassy in Tokyo.

History
Although formal relations were established in 1956, the cultural ties between Nepal and Japan date back to much earlier days before direct people to people contact started in 1899.

Japanese assistance
Much of the aid to Nepal is delivered in cooperation with the Asian Development Bank. Japan is one of the largest aid donors to Nepal. As of May 2009, Japan has provided the following level of financial assistance and donations to Nepal:
 Loans: 58.4 billion yen  
 Grants: 13.6 billion yen 
 Technical Cooperation: 42.6 billion yen

Examples of Japanese assistance include:
 In 2001 Japan offered a loan of up to 5,494 million yen for the construction of the Mahankal-Melamchi water treatment plant for Kathmandu.

 In 2004, Japan committed a loan of US$160 million (50% of total foreign assistance to the project) for Nepal's biggest hydroelectric project called Kaligandaki 'A'
 In 2004, Japan agreed to write off a loan of about $200m to Nepal, which was used to fund development projects. The money was to be diverted to poverty alleviation schemes.
 In 2007, in cooperation with the Asian Development Bank and the Dutch Government, Japan provided US$600,000 to develop the water supply and sanitation sector in small towns in Nepal.
 In 2008,  Japan granted US$750,000 to assist Nepal in preparing a project design to improve the quality of air transport services.

Defence
In 2007, Japan sent self-defence troops to Nepal as part of a United Nations mission to help implement a peace agreement.

See also 

 Foreign relations of Japan
 Foreign relations of Nepal

References

External links 
 Embassy of Japan in Nepal
 Embassy of Nepal in Tokyo

 
Nepal 
Bilateral relations of Nepal